Eden Fire is the debut album by Swedish heavy metal band Sonic Syndicate. It is their first and only album to be released through the American record label, Pivotal Rockordings. The album was recorded and mixed at Studiomega from February 2005 to June 2005 by Christian Silver and Manne Engström. The album was re-released on December 9, 2008 via Pivotal Rockordings/Koch in North America and Canada. Because of this, the album would sell over 10,000 copies by the end of 2010. It was also the last record by the band before parting ways with drummer Kristoffer Bäcklund and pianist Andreas Mårtensson.

Album background
The album is made up of three different segments and each segment has a continuous theme/concept throughout its tracks. Two of those segments consist of the previous demos Black Lotus and Extinction. The songs from those demos were re-worked and re-recorded for this album. The other segment, "Helix Reign" consists of three new tracks.

Track listing
All lyrics written by Richard Sjunnesson, all music written by Roger Sjunnesson, all music arranged by Sonic Syndicate.

"Helix Reign – Chronicles of a Broken Covenant"
 "Jailbreak"– 4:12
 "Enhance My Nightmare" – 5:10
 "History Repeats Itself" – 3:52
 "Extinction – A Sinwar Quadrilogy"  
"Zion Must Fall" – 4:31
 "Misanthropic Coil" – 3:53
 "Lament of Innocence" – 3:43
 "Prelude to Extinction" – 4:00
 "Black Lotus – The Shadow Flora" 
"Soulstone Splinter" – 4:18
 "Crowned in Despair" – 4:33
 "Where the Black Lotus Grows" – 4:47

Personnel
Sonic Syndicate
 Richard Sjunnesson - vocals
 Roger Sjunnesson - lead guitar
 Robin Sjunnesson - rhythm guitar
 Karin Axelsson – bass guitar (all tracks), vocals (tracks 2 and 9)
 Kristoffer Bäcklund - drums
 Andreas Mårtensson - keyboards

Additional musicians
 Roland Johansson - vocals (tracks 1, 2, 3, 6 and 7)
 Robert Sjunnesson - guitar solo (track 8)
 Manne Engström - guitars
 Christian Silver - guitars
 Linus Vikström - guitars
 Ulf Larsson - guitars
 Kaj Michelsson - guitars

Production
 Dragan Tanaskovic - producer/mixer
 Christian Silver - producer/mixer
 Johan Örnborg - assistant producer/mixer
 Jose A. Aranguren - artwork

References

2005 debut albums
Sonic Syndicate albums